Fred Smith (born  – death unknown) was an English rugby league footballer who played in the 1900s, 1910s and 1920s.

Background
Fred Smith was born in Woodlesford, Leeds, West Riding of Yorkshire, England.

Playing career

International honours
Fred Smith won caps for England while at Hunslet in 1909 against Wales, in 1910 against Wales (2 matches), in 1911 against Wales, Australia (2 matches), in 1912 against Wales, and won caps for Great Britain while at Hunslet on the 1910 Great Britain Lions tour of Australia and New Zealand against Australia, Australasia and New Zealand, in 1911 against Australia (2 matches), in 1912 against Australia, and in 1914 against Australia (3 matches), and New Zealand.

Challenge Cup Final appearances
Fred Smith played , and scored a try in Hunslet's 14–0 victory over Hull F.C. in the 1908 Challenge Cup Final during the 1907–08 season at Fartown Ground, Huddersfield on Saturday 25 April 1908, in front of a crowd of 18,000.

County Cup Final appearances
Fred Smith played right-, i.e. number 3, in Hunslet's 17–0 victory over Halifax in the 1907 Yorkshire County Cup Final during the 1907–08 season at Headingley Rugby Stadium, Leeds on Saturday 21 December 1907.

All Four Cups, and "The Terrible Six"
Fred Smith was a member of Hunslet's 1907–08 All Four Cups winning team.

Testimonial match
At the end of the 1919–20 season, a Testimonial match for both Bill Jukes, and Fred Smith, took place between Hunslet and Billy Batten's Hunslet XIII, a team of former Hunslet players, including a 48-year-old Albert Goldthorpe, who scored a drop goal, the match took place at Parkside, Hunslet.

References

England national rugby league team players
English rugby league players
Great Britain national rugby league team players
Hunslet F.C. (1883) players
Place of birth missing
Place of death missing
Rugby league five-eighths
Rugby league halfbacks
Rugby league players from Leeds
Year of death missing
Yorkshire rugby league team players
Year of birth uncertain